The following lists events that happened in 1994 in Iceland.

Incumbents
President – Vigdís Finnbogadóttir 
Prime Minister – Davíð Oddsson

Events

Births

3 January – Einar Kristgeirsson, alpine skier.
3 January – Gudmunda Brynja Óladóttir, footballer
27 January – Erla Ásgeirsdóttir, alpine skier.
9 May – Árni Vilhjálmsson, footballer
16 September – Martin Hermannsson, basketball player
3 November – Tinna Odinsdottir, artistic gymnast
10 November – Aron Elís Þrándarson, footballer

Full date missing
Freydis-Halla Einarsdóttir, alpine skier

Deaths
7 April – Albert Guðmundsson, footballer (b. 1923)
18 November – Lúdvik Jósepsson, politician (b. 1914)

References

 
1990s in Iceland
Iceland
Iceland
Years of the 20th century in Iceland